Anthony Edward Golembeski (May 25, 1900 – March 9, 1976) was an American professional football player and coach in the National Football League for the Providence Steam Roller. He also played at the college level and became an All-East football star while attending Holy Cross. In 1926–27 he coached the Providence College basketball program to its first officially recognized NCAA win in the school history. He served as the head football coach at Providence from 1925 to 1933, compiling a record of 27–34–12.

Head coaching record

College football

References

External links
 

1900 births
1976 deaths
American football centers
American football ends
American football guards
American men's basketball coaches
Basketball coaches from Kentucky
College men's basketball head coaches in the United States
Holy Cross Crusaders football players
Players of American football from Kentucky
Providence Friars football coaches
Providence Friars men's basketball coaches
Providence Steam Roller coaches
Providence Steam Roller players